Logan Township is a township in Huntingdon County, Pennsylvania, United States. The population was 618 at the 2020 census.

Geography
According to the United States Census Bureau, the township has a total area of 22.8 square miles (59.2 km2), of which 22.7 square miles (58.8 km2)  is land and 0.2 square mile (0.4 km2)  (0.66%) is water.

Demographics

At the 2000 census there were 703 people in 273 households, including 202 families, in the township.  The population density was 31.0 people per square mile (12.0/km2).  There were 315 housing units at an average density of 13.9/sq mi (5.4/km2).  The racial makeup of the township was 97.72% White, 1.56% African American, 0.14% Native American, 0.14% Asian, and 0.43% from two or more races. Hispanic or Latino of any race were 0.14%.

There were 273 households, 33.0% had children under the age of 18 living with them, 64.5% were married couples living together, 8.1% had a female householder with no husband present, and 26.0% were non-families. 23.4% of households were made up of individuals, and 12.1% were one person aged 65 or older.  The average household size was 2.58 and the average family size was 3.06.

The age distribution was 24.3% under the age of 18, 7.8% from 18 to 24, 26.7% from 25 to 44, 27.3% from 45 to 64, and 13.8% 65 or older.  The median age was 40 years. For every 100 females there were 100.9 males.  For every 100 females age 18 and over, there were 101.5 males.

The median household income was $36,083 and the median family income was $39,531. Males had a median income of $26,667 versus $23,438 for females. The per capita income for the township was $15,051.  About 8.0% of families and 8.5% of the population were below the poverty line, including 8.4% of those under age 18 and 9.5% of those age 65 or over.

References

Townships in Huntingdon County, Pennsylvania
Townships in Pennsylvania